Samuel Carnell (1832 – 14 October 1920) was a Liberal Party Member of Parliament in Hawke's Bay, New Zealand.

Member of Parliament

He won the Napier electorate with the swing to the Liberals in 1893, but lost in 1896 to the conservative candidate.

Mayor of Napier
He was the Mayor of Napier from 1904 to 1907.

References

1832 births
1920 deaths
New Zealand Liberal Party MPs
Mayors of Napier, New Zealand
New Zealand MPs for North Island electorates
Members of the New Zealand House of Representatives
19th-century New Zealand politicians